There have been two ships named TSS Manx Maid:

 , a packet steamer initially operated by the London and Southwestern Railway Company under the name Caesarea
 , the first car ferry operated by the Isle of Man Steam Packet Company

Ship names